Rubén Héctor Di Monte (12 April 1932 – 18 April 2016) was a Roman Catholic archbishop.

Ordained to the priesthood in 1954, Di Monte was named auxiliary bishop of the Roman Catholic Diocese of Avellaneda, Argentina in 1986. From 1988 until 2000, Di Mont served as bishop from Avellaneda. From 2000 until 2007. Di Monti served as archbishop of the Roman Catholic Archdiocese of Mercedes-Luján.

See also

Notes

1932 births
2016 deaths
21st-century Roman Catholic archbishops in Argentina
Roman Catholic bishops of Avellaneda-Lanús
Roman Catholic archbishops of Mercedes-Luján